Below is a list of schools in the Southeast Asian country of Brunei.  The list includes both government and private primary, secondary and tertiary schools. Muslim students below a certain age are also expected to attend classes in religious institutions after the normal schooling hours.

Primary schools

Government schools

Brunei I District schools

SR Bendahara Lama
SR Dato Godam (closed 2014)
SR Datu Ahmad
SR Haji Tarif
SR Mabohai
SR Pap Besar
SR Pehin Dato Jamil
SR Pintu Malim
SR Pusar Ulak
SR Raja Isteri Fatimah
SR Saba Darat
SR Pengiran Anak teri Besar, Sungai Kebun
SR Sungai Siamas
SR Sungraila Siamas

Brunei II District schools

SR Amar Pahlawan
SR Anggerek Desa
SR Batu Marang
SR Berakas Garrisen
SR Dato Basir
SR Datu Gandi (closed)
SR Dato Marsal
SR Delima Satu
SR DMW Lambak
SR HMS Sungai Hanching
SR Lambak Kiri
SR Mentiri
SR OKBI Subok
SR Pantai Berakas ABDB
SR PTL Muara
SR Pulaie
SR YSHHB
SR SAB Sungai Besar
SR Serasa
SR Suas Muara
SR Tanah Jambu

Brunei III District schools

SR Bendahara Sakam Bunut
SR Bengkurong
SR HMJ Maun Kiulap
SR Jerudong
SR Katok 'A'
SR Kg Mata-Mata
SR Kiarong
SR Mulaut
SR OKSB Kilanas
SR PPSD Sahibul Bandar
SR Sengkurong
SR Telanai
SR Tungku
SR Rimba 1
SR Rimba 2
SR Rimba 3
SR kati mahar

Brunei IV District schools

SR Bebuloh
SR Junjongan
SR Kasat
SR Lumapas
SR Masin
SR NAR Menunggol
SR Panchor Murai
SR PB Limau Manis
SR Pengkalan Batu
SR Pudak (closed 2004)
SR Pulau Baru-Baru
SR Putat

Tutong I District schools

SR Bakiau
SR Batang Mitus
SR Binturan (MOD)
SR Birau
SR Bukit Panggal
SR Keriam
SR kg Menengah
SR Kiudang
SR Lamunin
SR Muda Hashim
SR OKAWSD Kupang
SR PDN Pg Jaya
SR Penanjong
SR Pg Muda Mahkota
SR Sinaut
SR Tutong Kem (MOD)

Tutong II District schools

SR AR Tanjong Maya
SR Belabau (Closed)
SR Benutan
SR Bukit Udal
SR Danau
SR DPS Ukong
SR kg Bukit
SR Layong (Closed)
SR Long Mayan (Closed)
SR Lubok Pulau
SR Panchong
SR Penapar
SR PKN Bukit Beruang
SR RPN Bukit Beruang
SR Rambai
SR Sg Damit Pemadang (Closed)
SR Supon (Closed)
SR Tumpuan Telisai

Belait District schools

SR Ahmad Tajuddin
SR DMSD Sukang
SR Kuala Belait
SR Labi
SR Lumut
SR Melilas
SR Merangking
SR Muhammad Alam
SR OKPB Bukit Sawat
SR Panaga
SR PSJ Pg Abd Momin
SR PSN Pg Mohd Yusof
SR Rampayoh (closed)
SR Sungai Liang
SR Sungai Tali
SR Sungai Teraban

Temburong District schools

SR Amo
SR Bokok
SR Kenua (closed)
SR Labu Estate
SR Negalang
SR Puni
SR Selangan
SR Selapon
SR Semabat
SR Senukoh
SR Sultan Hashim
SR Sultan Hassan
SR Piasau piasau (closed 2015)

Religious schools

Sek Ugama Beribi Gadong
Sek Arab Sungai Akar BSB
Sek Persediaan Arab B.S.B.
Sek Persediaan Arab Temburong
Sek Al-Falaah Sungai Akar
Sek Ugama Daerah Belait
Sek Ugama Daerah Temburong
Sek Ugama Daerah Tutong
Sek Ugama Kawasan Brunei I
Sek Ugama Kawasan Brunei II
Sek Ugama Kawasan Brunei III
Sek Ugama Kawasan Brunei IV
Sek Ugama Lambak Jln Bedil
Sek Ugama Madang
Sek Ugama Menglait
Sek Ugama Pengiran Anak Puteri Majeedah, Kilanas
Sek Ugama Pengiran Anak Puteri Masna
Sek Ugama Pengiran Anak Puteri Mutawakillah Hayatul Bolkiah Serusop
Sek Ugama Rimba 1
Sek Ugama Tungku

Private schools

Jigsaw Primary School
Learning Tree School
Nusa Laila Puteri School
Sekolah Cemerlang Abejess (SECA school)
Sekolah Persekutuan Guru Guru Melayu Brunei, P.G.G.M.B, Sg Akar
Seri Mulia Sarjana International School
Seri Mulia Sarjana School
Sinaran Mas School
Stella's School
DES School (Brunei Private School)
Yayasan Sultan Haji Hassanal Bolkiah Primary School
Bright Jigsaw International School
 Sekolah Tadika Jaya Datin Hajah Malai Ragayah.

Brunei I District schools 

Miftah An-Nur Islamic International School
Iqra Primary School

Tutong District schools 

Chung Hwa – Kiudang
Nusa Jaya – Tutong
Sekolah Pertama – Tutong
SR Mustadim – Tutong

Belait District schools 

ABC School – Belait
Calvert
Chung Ching Middle School – Seria
Chung Hua Middle School – Kuala Belait
Chung Hwa – Labi
Chung Lian – Sg Liang
Panaga
St Angela's Convent – Seria
St James's – Kuala Belait
St John's – Kuala Belait
St. Margaret's School – Seria
St Michael's – Seria (closed)
Tadika Alif
Tunas Jaya PGGMB – Belait

Temburong District schools 

Pai Yuek Bangar
Suria Jaya Kindergarten School

Secondary schools

Sixth form schools
 Belait Sixth Form Centre
 Duli Pengiran Muda Al-Muhtadee Billah College
 Hassanal Bolkiah Boys' Arabic Secondary School
 Meragang Sixth Form Centre
 Sayyidina Ali Secondary School
 Sengkurong Sixth Form Centre
 Tutong Sixth Form Centre

Post-secondary and tertiary institutions

Institute of Brunei Technical Education
Brunei Technological University (Universiti Teknologi Brunei; formerly Institut Teknologi Brunei)
Sultan Sharif Ali Islamic University (Universiti Islam Sultan Sharif Ali)
University of Brunei Darussalam (Universiti Brunei Darussalam)
Seri Begawan Religious Teachers University College (Kolej Universiti Perguruan Ugama Seri Begawan)

See also 

 Education in Asia
 Lists of schools

External links
 Brunei School Directory

Schools
Schools
Schools
Brunei
Brunei